Locust Grove State Historic Site, located near St. Francisville, Louisiana, commemorates a family cemetery that is part of the former Locust Grove Plantation. Locust Grove Plantation was once owned by the family of former Confederate President Jefferson Davis' sister Anna E. Davis Smith. Among the notable figures buried at the cemetery are Sarah Knox Taylor Davis, daughter of General Zachary Taylor and married to Jefferson Davis, and Eleazer Wheelock Ripley, a distinguished general who served in the War of 1812. Locust Grove Cemetery was deeded to the Office of State Parks in 1937 by heirs of Mrs Anna E. Davis Smith.

See also
 Audubon State Historic Site
 Port Hudson State Historic Site
 List of Louisiana state historic sites

References

External links
 Locust Grove State Historic Site – Louisiana State Parks page
 

Cemeteries in Louisiana
Louisiana State Historic Sites
Protected areas established in 1937
Protected areas of West Feliciana Parish, Louisiana